Hangin' In was a Canadian television sitcom which aired on CBC from 1981 to 1987. It aired briefly on Nickelodeon and in syndication in the United States.

Synopsis
The show starred Lally Cadeau as Kate Brown, the attractive and charismatic director of a youth drop-in centre in Toronto, and blended both comedy and drama in its portrayal of genuine teen counselling problems. David Eisner starred as Michael DiFalco, a young, affable staff counsellor, and Ruth Springford appeared as Doris Webster, the centre's receptionist. Many young Canadian actors, including Eric McCormack, Keanu Reeves, Jessica Steen and Mark Humphrey, made guest appearances as teenaged clients of the youth centre.

During the show's final season, Cadeau was replaced for the final five episodes by Fiona Reid as Maggie. This change was planned, as the producers were setting up a new spin-off series to star Reid as the director of a halfway house for young offenders. However, the new series was not picked up.

Production
The show was created by the same production team, led by executive producer Jack Humphrey, with Anna Sandor and Joseph Partington, behind one of the most successful Canadian sitcoms in television history, King of Kensington, which had itself evolved in its late episodes toward a similar concept and setting.

The series premiered on January 7, 1981, the day after the final episode of the dramatic miniseries You've Come a Long Way, Katie, which also starred Cadeau. Writing for Maclean's, Bill MacVicar likened the streak of Cadeau's roles in two different series airing on four consecutive nights to "the video equivalent of being shot from a cannon or, at least, making a premiere entrance on a red carpet, with klieg lights and a ravenous crowd of autograph seekers".

References

External links

 
 Hangin' In Episode Guide at TV Archive Site

1981 Canadian television series debuts
1987 Canadian television series endings
1980s Canadian sitcoms
CBC Television original programming
English-language television shows
Television series about teenagers
Television shows set in Toronto
Television shows filmed in Toronto